= Louis Chapotot =

French instrument maker of the 17th century

Louis Chapotot (17th century) was a French scientific instrument maker.

French maker of optical and mathematical instruments. Worked in Paris, 1670–1700, at Quai de l'Horloge du Palais à la Sphère. He was an apprentice to Guillaume Ménard and appointed Master of the Corporation des Fondeurs. He produced many types of instruments, including sundials, surveying instruments, mathematical instruments, and simple microscopes. His son Jean continued the business until about 1721.
